The India women's national cricket team toured England in June and July 1999. They played three One Day Internationals and one Test match against England, winning the ODI series 2–1 and drawing the Test match. They also played against Ireland in an ODI, which they won by 161 runs.

Squads

Tour Matches

3-day match: England Under-21s v India

50-over match: England A v India

50-over match: North of England v India

Only ODI: Ireland v India

WODI Series

1st ODI

2nd ODI

3rd ODI

Only Test

References

External links
India Women tour of England 1999 from Cricinfo

India women's national cricket team tours
Women's cricket tours of England
1999 in women's cricket